The University of Houston System is a public university system in Texas, comprising four separate and distinct universities. It also owns and holds broadcasting licenses to a public television station (KUHT) and a public radio station (KUHF).

The fourth-largest university system in Texas, the UH System has more than 70,000 students and 495,000 alumni from the four distinct universities. Its flagship institution is the University of Houston, a comprehensive doctoral degree-granting research university of about 43,000 students. The economic impact of the UH System contributes over $3 billion annually to the Texas economy, while generating about 24,000 jobs.

The administration is housed in the Ezekiel W. Cullen Building, located on the campus of the University of Houston. The chancellor of the UH System is Renu Khator, who serves concurrently as president of the University of Houston. The System is governed by nine voting-member board of regents, appointed by the Governor of Texas.

Component institutions
The University of Houston System has four separate and distinct institutions; each institution is a stand-alone university and confers its own degrees. Its flagship institution is the University of Houston. The three other institutions in the System are  universities; they are not branch campuses of the University of Houston.

Admission into each institution is separate, and each institution has distinct admission criteria and requirements.

History
 
The University of Houston, founded in 1927, entered the state system of higher education in 1963. The evolvement of a  University of Houston System came from a recommendation in May 1968 which called for the creation of a university near NASA's Manned Spacecraft Center to offer upper-division and graduate-level programs. By 1971, the 62nd Texas Legislature passed House Bill 199 authorizing the establishment of the University of Houston at Clear Lake City as a separate and distinct institution with the organization and control vested in the Board of Regents of the University of Houston.

Recognizing the need for a university presence in Downtown Houston, the board of regents acquired the assets of South Texas Junior College on August 6, 1974 and opened the University of Houston–Downtown College (UH/DC) as a four-year institution under the organization and control of the University of Houston. By August 1979, it became a stand-alone university when the 66th Texas Legislature established UH/DC as a separate and distinct institution in the University of Houston System.

The University of Houston System was created by statute on August 29, 1977, under House Bill 188 during the 65th Texas Legislature. The Board of Regents of the University of Houston was renamed the Board of Regents of the University of Houston System. Philip G. Hoffman became the first chancellor of the System, after serving as president of the University of Houston from 1961 to 1977.

During the 68th Texas Legislature, Senate Bill 235 (SB 235) was signed into law and became effective immediately on April 26, 1983. The bill statutorily established the University of Houston–Victoria as a separate and distinct institution in the University of Houston System, and allowed the university system to acquire and dispose of land or other real property outside of Harris County. In addition, SB 235 changed the names of existing UH System institutions as follows:
University of Houston was renamed University of Houston–University Park;
University of Houston at Clear Lake City was renamed University of Houston–Clear Lake; and
University of Houston–Downtown College was renamed University of Houston–Downtown.

 
A proposal to reorganize and consolidate state university systems emerged in 1986. The UH System would have been merged into a new university system to include a total of 10 institutions under the recommended reorganization referred to as the "Gulf Coast System." The proposed consolidation grouping drew oppositions from affected institutions, and the plan never materialized.

In 1991, the University of Houston–University Park reverted to its original name: University of Houston. The addition of the "University Park" appellation was done with little discussion and had never gained community acceptance.

In 1997, the administrations of the UH System and the University of Houston were combined under a single chief executive officer, with the dual title of Chancellor of the UH System and President of the University of Houston. Arthur K. Smith became the first person to have held the combined position.

In November 2007, Renu Khator was selected as the eighth chancellor of the University of Houston System and thirteenth president of the University of Houston. Khator became the first female to hold the chancellorship position, and took office in January 2008. She is the third person to hold the dual role of UH System chancellor and UH president.

On November 16, 2011, the University of Houston System announced that the University of Houston as an institution would replace the university system as the administrative entity for the University of Houston System at Sugar Land. With this action, the campus was renamed the "University of Houston Sugar Land" in January 2012.

Organizational structure

Governance
The governance, control, jurisdiction, organization, and management of the University of Houston System is vested in its board of regents. The board has all the rights, powers, and duties that it has with respect to the organization and control of the four component institutions in the System; however, each component institution is maintained as a separate and distinct university.

The Board consists of a chair, secretary, and seven other members, including one student who serves a one-year term as regent. Every two years, the Governor of Texas, subject to the confirmation of the Texas Senate, appoints three members to the board of regents. Every member except for the student regent serves a six-year term. Responsibilities for members are specifically listed in the bylaws of the board of regents.

The chairman of the board of regents is Tilman J. Fertitta, CEO of Landry's, Inc. Fertitta attended the University of Houston, and was a student in the Hilton College. He was appointed to the board in 2009, and will serve through August 31, 2027—having been reappointed for an additional six-year term.

Administration

The chancellor is the chief executive officer of the University of Houston System. The chancellor, appointed by the System's board of regents, has certain authorities that are specified in the regent bylaws. The chancellor has the option to delegate responsibilities to others such as the vice-chancellor, university presidents, and university athletic directors. Such delegations are subject to the board of regents bylaws and UH System policies.

Since 1997, the UH System chancellor has been serving concurrently as the President of the University of Houston. Thus, the chancellor holds a dual role. As of January 2008, Renu Khator has been the chancellor of UH System and president of the University of Houston.  The administration of the System is located in the Ezekiel W. Cullen Building on the campus of the University of Houston.

The Chancellor's official residence is known as the "Wortham House." The house was designed by Alfred C. Finn, and built by Frank P. Sterling in 1925 as the "Sterling House." In 1948, the house was donated to the Museum of Fine Arts, Houston, and later sold to Gus and Lyndall Wortham in 1951. Upon her death in July 1980, Lyndall Wortham donated the property to the University of Houston. The house, located in the Houston neighborhood of Southampton, serves as a facility for small functions or gatherings of the UH System.

References

External links

 

 
Houston System
 University of Houston System
Houston
1977 establishments in Texas